Bramham cum Oglethorpe is a civil parish in the metropolitan borough of the City of Leeds, West Yorkshire, England.  It contains 40 listed buildings that are recorded in the National Heritage List for England. Of these, nine are listed at Grade I, the highest of the three grades, two are at Grade II*, the middle grade, and the others are at Grade II, the lowest grade.  The parish contains the village of Bramham and the surrounding area.  In the parish is Bramham Park, a country house, which is listed together with a number of structures in its grounds.  The other listed buildings include houses, cottages and associated structures, farmhouses and farm buildings, a church, the remains of a medieval cross, a disused windmill, a former aircraft hangar, and a war memorial.



Key

Buildings

Notes and references

Notes

Citations

Sources

 

Lists of listed buildings in West Yorkshire